Metehan Başar (born February 19, 1991) is a twice world-champion Turkish wrestler competing in the 85 kg division of Greco-Roman wrestling. He is a member of the İstanbul Büyükşehir Belediyesi S.K.

He won the silver medal in the 85 kg event at the 2007 Black Sea Games held in Trabzon, Turkey. Başar became bronze medalist at the 2015 European Games in Baku, Azerbaijan. He won the silver medal at the 2017 European Wrestling Championships in Novi Sad, Serbia. He won the gold medal at the 2017 World Wrestling Championships in Paris, France.

In March 2021, he competed at the European Qualification Tournament in Budapest, Hungary, hoping to qualify for the 2020 Summer Olympics in Tokyo, Japan.

In 2022, he won one of the bronze medals in his event at the Vehbi Emre & Hamit Kaplan Tournament held in Istanbul, Turkey. He lost his bronze medal match in the 97kg event at the 2022 World Wrestling Championships held in Belgrade, Serbia.

References

External links
 

Living people
1991 births
People from Sapanca
Turkish male sport wrestlers
Istanbul Büyükşehir Belediyespor athletes
Wrestlers at the 2015 European Games
European Games medalists in wrestling
European Games bronze medalists for Turkey
World Wrestling Championships medalists
Competitors at the 2018 Mediterranean Games
Mediterranean Games gold medalists for Turkey
Mediterranean Games medalists in wrestling
Wrestlers at the 2019 European Games
European Wrestling Championships medalists
20th-century Turkish people
21st-century Turkish people